The railway to Stony Crossing, New South Wales, was sanctioned as part of the Border Railways Act 1922. It was often referred to as the Gonn Crossing to Stony Crossing railway, although it originated at Kerang, Victoria and served Murrabit, before running into New South Wales at Gonn Crossing on the Murray River.

The first section to Murrabit was opened in December 1924. The combined rail/road bridge at Gonn Crossing was opened on 1 July 1926, and the complete railway to Stony Crossing was opened on 16 March 1928.

Initially, there were three trains per week to Murrabit, with one continuing to Stony Crossing.  Services were suspended between Murrabit and Stony Crossing in 1943.

On 20 April 1961, a steam locomotive had an accident on a small bridge between Kerang and Murrabit, and as a result services to between Kerang and Murrabit were suspended.  The railway was closed on 20 December 1961.

See also

 Rail transport in Victoria
 Rail transport in New South Wales

References

Closed regional railway lines in New South Wales
Railway lines in Victoria (Australia)
Railway lines opened in 1928
1928 establishments in Australia
Railway lines closed in 1961
1961 disestablishments in Australia